Prso or PRSO may refer to:
 Dado Pršo (born 1974), Croatian footballer
 Milan Pršo (born 1990), Serbian footballer
 Puerto Rico Symphony Orchestra